Honda has made several different motorcycle designs with the designation CB250, beginning with the Honda Dream CB250 in 1968.

Other Honda CB250 models include:
Honda CB250 (1968–73)
Honda CB250 G5 (1974–1976)
  Honda CB250T Dream (1977-1978)
Honda CB250N Super Dream (1979–1981)
Honda CB250RS (1980–1984)
Honda CB250 Nighthawk (1982–2008)
Honda CB250 Jade, based on the 1986-1996 CBR250
Honda CB250F, also known as the 250 Hornet, the replacement for the CB250 Jade

CB250